Pasažieru vilciens ("Passenger train", abbreviated: PV) is the only passenger-carrying railway company in Latvia, operating both electric and diesel trains on various lines throughout the country. It was formed in November 2001 by bringing together two separate companies, PPU "Elektrovilciens" ("Electric Train") and PPU "Dīzeļvilciens" ("Diesel Train"), under one name, creating the first subsidiary of Latvian Railways (Latvijas dzelzceļš). As of October 2008 JSC "Pasažieru vilciens" is an independent state-owned company. As of 2017, the company employed 1,075 people.

PV currently operates ten routes (four electric, six diesel) with its main operating base being the capital city, Riga; and carried 18.6 million passengers in 2019.

Routes

JSC "Pasažieru vilciens" makes the passenger transports in the following electric train routes:
 Rīga – Carnikava – Saulkrasti – Skulte
 Rīga – Dubulti – Sloka – Ķemeri – Tukums 1 – Tukums 2
 Rīga – Jelgava
 Rīga – Ogre – Lielvārde – Aizkraukle

and in the following diesel train routes:
Rīga – Jelgava – Dobele – Liepāja
Rīga – Krustpils – Līvāni – Daugavpils – Krāslava – Indra
Rīga – Krustpils – Rēzekne – Zilupe
Rīga – Pļaviņas – Madona – Gulbene
Rīga – Sigulda – Cēsis – Valmiera – Valga

Stations
The main stations on the PV network are:
Aizkraukle
Carnikava
Cēsis
Daugavpils
Dobele
Dubulti
Jelgava
Krustpils
Ķemeri
Lielvārde
Liepāja
Līvāni
Madona
Ogre
Pļaviņas
Rēzekne
Rīga
Saulkrasti
Sigulda
Skulte
Sloka
Torņakalns
Tukums
Valga (Estonia)
Valmiera
Vecāķi
Zemitāni
Zilupe

Rolling stock

The current rolling stock consists of mainly elderly Soviet-period trains built locally by Rīgas Vagonbūves Rūpnīca (RVR), although some have been refurbished in recent years. In 2016 PV received 19 modernized DR1A DMU train wagons from DMU vilcieni in cooperation with RVR, Daugavpils Lokomotīvju Remonta Rūpnīca and Zasulauks depot. However, LSM reported in October 2016 that the refurbished wagons soon experienced quality issues.

The livery of electric trains and some diesel trains is yellow and blue, while some refurbished DMUs are in red and white.

Future upgrades

Electric trains 
The first project for the procurement of new trains was announced in 2010 and 2011. In 2012 PV ordered 34 three-car electric multiple unit trains and seven three-car diesel multiple unit trains from CAF to be built on the Civity platform, with plans to manufacture them in cooperation with RVR. Later that year the contract was halted due to irregularities and an appeal from Stadler with the European Commission, an initial financial supporter of the project, and a new procurement organized. A hire/purchase contract for 25 Stadler FLIRT EMUs was likewise cancelled in July 2014 after an appeal from the other participant, Hyundai Rotem, and another tender organized.

In December 2015, four contenders – Talgo, CAF, Stadler Polska and Škoda Vagonka – continued participation in the second stage of the train procurement project. The contract includes the delivery of 32 electric trains with a capacity of 450 each, from 2020 to 2023, maintenance equipment, spare parts for five years and staff training. Talgo's VitTal was announced as the provisional winner of the €225.3 million contract in November 2018 although Škoda rejected the methodology used to assess price competitiveness. Škoda and CAF filed a successful appeal of the results of the procurement in December, while Stadler expressed disappointment at the results. After reviewing the results of the contest under instructions from the government's procurement watchdog agency, the Procurement Monitoring Bureau (PMB), PV announced on February 15, 2019 that the offer from Škoda worth €241.88 million has been selected as the new winner, based on revised electricity consumption cost estimates. Talgo announced in a press release the same day that they will contest the decision.

On May 21, 2019, PV announced that after the second revision of the submitted bids, Škoda was again confirmed as the winner, however, the decision could yet again be contested. The offer of Talgo was mentioned as to have had a lower price per unit, but the maintenance costs of Škoda trains were found to be lower with the total cost lower as well. Minister of Transport Tālis Linkaits commented on this that due to potential issues regarding the implication of Škoda Transportation A.S., a subsidiary of Škoda Transportation Group and a sister company of Škoda Vagonka, in recent corruption scandals concerning the Rīgas Satiksme public transport company, a failure to wrap up the procurement by the end of the year might lead to the dissolution of PV. The PMB turned down the final complaint by Talgo on July 4, giving PV the go-ahead to sign a contract with Škoda Vagonka. In a statement, the PV predicted that they would receive the first trains in late 2021, with the last ones being shipped in late 2023.

The contract between PV and Škoda Vagonka a.s. was finally signed on 30 July 2019. Under the agreement, all 32 EMU trains have to be delivered by 2023 or 140 weeks after the contract takes effect. Each 109-meter-long four-car train with a top speed of 160 km/h will accommodate 436 seated and 450 standing passengers. The trains are expected to operate services from Riga to Aizkraukle, Tukums, Jelgava and Skulte, as well as the inter-urban routes from to Krustpils, Daugavpils and Rēzekne which are expected to be electrified at 25 kV 50 Hz for completion by the end of 2023. In February 2020, a new yellow and gray livery design created by Teika Design Studio for the future trains was unveiled by PV. Due to 2022 Russian invasion of Ukraine, the end date of full delivery was postponed till at least end of 2023, because originally it was planned to deliver all trains to Latvia on tracks through Ukraine and Belarus, due to the same track gauge, but now it is not possible. The first four-car train was delivered in June 2022 in parts by road through Poland and Lithuania and will be used for testing purposes in the coming months. Each train will be designed for 436 passengers.

Diesel and battery trains 
In May 2020, PV announced that it would procure 8 new diesel trains to replace existing DMUs with Russian-made engines due to the addition of the manufacturers to the United States sanctions list. Five bidders applied, with three advancing to the second round in July - CAF, Pesa Bydgoszcz and Stadler Polska. PV said it planned to sign a contract by December 31. 

However, this did not materialise, in part due to uncertainties concerning available funding and with the Ministry of Transport switching its focus on acquiring battery-powered trains (BEMU) by 2026, citing such upsides as a lesser impact on the environment and less noise. The ministry announced plans to order feasibility study for evaluating the technological and economic aspects of the intended purchase in the second half of 2021. The ministry added that the BEMUs would be mainly used in Riga and the Riga region. 

A tender for 9 BEMU trains (with an option to by seven additional ones if funding is available) was announced on 13 April 2022 by the Road Transport Administration, which predicted that new units for the new Bolderāja – Sigulda line would be delivered by the end of 2026. Each train would have a capacity of 200–240 seats and the overall cost was predicted at €75-76 million. The submission deadline for the first round was June, with the second round scheduled for autumn 2022.

References

External links
JSC "Pasažieru vilciens" train routes and zonal tariffs
Gulbene-Alūksne short-gauge railway

Railway companies of Latvia
Companies based in Riga
Railway companies established in 2001
Latvian companies established in 2001